Muhammad Baligh Ur Rehman (born 21 December 1970) is a Pakistani politician who is serving as 39th Governor of Punjab in office since 30 May 2022 and was appointed by President Arif Alvi, on advice of Prime Minister Shehbaz Sharif. He took the oath of Governor of Punjab on 30 May 2022, Chief Justice of the Lahore High Court, Muhammad Ameer Bhatti administered his oath. Previously he served as the Minister of State Federal Education and of Interior and Narcotics Control between 2013 and 2017. He had been a member of the National Assembly from 2008 to May 2018.

After assuming the charge of Governor he automatically become the Chancellor of the Public Sector Universities of the Punjab, Pakistan.

Early life
Baligh Ur Rehman was born on 21 December 1970 in Bahawalpur, Pakistan.
He spent 17 years studying in Sadiq Public School. He graduated from University of Pennsylvania.

Political career
Baligh was elected as the member of the National Assembly of Pakistan for the first time in 2008 Pakistani general election from Constituency NA-185 on PML-N ticket.

He was elected as the member of the National Assembly for the second time on PML-N ticket from NA-185 in 2013 Pakistani general election.

In June 2013, he was appointed as Minister of State for Federal Education and Professional Training.

In November 2013, he was given the additional charge of Minister of State for Interior and Narcotics Control in the cabinet of Nawaz Sharif. He had ceased to hold ministerial office in July 2017 when the federal cabinet was disbanded following the disqualification of Prime Minister Nawaz Sharif after Panama Papers case decision. Following the election of Shahid Khaqan Abbasi as Prime Minister of Pakistan in August 2017, he was inducted into the federal cabinet of Abbasi. He was elevated as federal minister and given the portfolio of Federal Minister of Education and Training. Upon the dissolution of the National Assembly on the expiration of its term on 31 May 2018, Baligh ceased to hold the office as Federal Minister for Federal Education and Professional Training.

On 30 May 2022, he was appointed as the 39th Governor of Punjab by Arif Alvi.

References

Living people
1970 births
Governors of Punjab, Pakistan
Pakistani MNAs 2008–2013
Pakistani MNAs 2013–2018
Sadiq Public School alumni
Education Ministers of Pakistan
Pakistan Muslim League (N) politicians